Mohajarabad (also Romanized as Mohājarābād) is a village in Shur Dasht Rural District, Shara District, Hamadan County, Hamadan Province, Iran. At the 2006 census, its population was 58, in 11 families.

References 

Populated places in Hamadan County